Henry Irving Hodes (March 19, 1899 – February 14, 1962) was a United States Army four-star general who served as Commander in Chief, United States Army Europe/Commander, Central Army Group from 1956 to 1959.

Military career/biography

Henry I. Hodes was born in Washington, D.C. on March 19, 1899.

He graduated from the United States Military Academy in 1920. Hodes began his military career in the horse mounted cavalry, in the Wyoming and Texas wilderness. He led the United States Army into the mechanized age of trucks, cars, jeeps, tanks, and airplanes. He attempted flying, but gave it up after a couple of crashes. His military career accelerated in World War II, which found him in the middle of war planning in Washington D.C.

He was wounded twice in World War II, while serving with the 112th Infantry Regiment in France and Belgium. He returned to the war after receiving a shoulder wound, but was sent back to the US after receiving a head wound on September 20, 1944, which required hospitalization. Hodes became a brigadier general on January 25, 1945. Other assignments included Assistant Deputy Chief of Staff, United States Army from 1945 to 1949, Assistant Commanding General, 1st Cavalry Division in 1949.

He served in the Korean War, where he was given the nickname "Hammering Hank". He served first as a field commander and later as a representative at Panmunjom – the Armistice Agreement with North Korea. His assignments during the war included Assistant Commanding General 7th Division from 1950 to 1951; Deputy Commanding General Eighth United States Army, 1951–52; and Commanding General 24th Division in 1952. He served as Commandant of the Command and General Staff College from 1952 to 1954, and was Commanding General, Seventh United States Army from 1954 to 1956. After serving in Korea, he returned to Germany. His service in post-war Europe was vital in the rebuilding efforts and designing defensive strategies opposite the communist Russians in East Germany and the Czech Republic, during the early 1950s.

He was promoted to the rank of general on June 1, 1956 and served as Commander in Chief, U.S. Army Europe and Commander, Central Army Group for NATO until his retirement from the Army on March 31, 1959.

He retired after serving more than 40 years in the US Army. He suffered from amyotrophic lateral sclerosis (ALS) and died at Brooke General Hospital in San Antonio, Texas on February 14, 1962. He was buried in Fort Sam Houston National Cemetery.

Personal life
He had two daughters and one son, Col John Taylor Hodes, US Army (Ret). John served in Korea and three consecutive tours of duty in Vietnam.

Military awards

References

External links
Generals.dk entry

1899 births
1962 deaths
United States Military Academy alumni
United States Army personnel of the Korean War
Commandants of the United States Army Command and General Staff College
Recipients of the Legion of Merit
Burials at Fort Sam Houston National Cemetery
United States Army generals of World War II
United States Army generals